HMAS Wallaroo (J222), named after the town of Wallaroo, South Australia, was one of 60 Bathurst-class corvettes constructed during World War II, and one of 36 initially manned and commissioned solely by the Royal Australian Navy (RAN). Wallaroo was one of only three Bathursts lost during World War II; following a collision with US Liberty ship Henry Gilbert Costin on the night of 11 June 1943.

Design and construction

In 1938, the Australian Commonwealth Naval Board (ACNB) identified the need for a general purpose 'local defence vessel' capable of both anti-submarine and mine-warfare duties, while easy to construct and operate. Construction of the prototype  did not go ahead, but the plans were retained. The need for locally built 'all-rounder' vessels at the start of World War II saw the "Australian Minesweepers" (designated as such to hide their anti-submarine capability, but popularly referred to as "corvettes") approved in September 1939, with 60 constructed during the course of the war: 36 (including Wallaroo) ordered by the RAN, 20 ordered by the British Admiralty but manned and commissioned as RAN vessels, and 4 for the Royal Indian Navy.

Wallaroo was laid down by Poole & Steel in Sydney on 24 April 1941. She was launched on 18 February 1942 by Mrs Poole, wife of the shipyard's Chairman of Directors, and commissioned on 15 July 1942.

Operational history
Wallaroo entered service in September 1942, patrolling between Adelaide in South Australia and Fremantle in Western Australia for submarines, as well as performing escort and minesweeping duties around Fremantle.

Just after midnight on 11 June 1943, while out to sea west of Fremantle, the corvette collided with United States Liberty Ship Henry Gilbert Costin. The night was overcast, and the ships were travelling without lights as a precaution against attacks. Three of Wallaroos crew were killed in the collision, and the corvette sank four hours later with no further casualties while trying to reach Fremantle. The Liberty Ship received minor damage, and made it to port.

The corvette's wartime service was recognised with the battle honour "Pacific 1942".

Citations

References
Books

Journal and news articles

Bathurst-class corvettes of the Royal Australian Navy
Ships built in New South Wales
1942 ships
World War II corvettes of Australia
World War II shipwrecks in the Indian Ocean
Shipwrecks of Western Australia
Maritime incidents in June 1943